Beaumont is an unincorporated community in Metcalfe County, Kentucky, United States.

References

Unincorporated communities in Metcalfe County, Kentucky
Unincorporated communities in Kentucky